Billa (Arabic: بلا) is a municipality in the Bsharri District, North Governorate of Lebanon.  The village is located near the towns of Barhalyoun and Aabdine. In 2014, there were 429 voters with 220 males and 209 females.

References 

Populated places in the North Governorate
Bsharri District